Douglas J. Church was an American football coach.  He served the ninth head football coach at New York University (NYU). He held that position for one seasons, in 1906, leading the NYU Violets to a record of 0–4.

Head coaching record

References

Year of birth missing
Year of death missing
NYU Violets football coaches